The 2017 Copa del Rey de Baloncesto is the 81st edition of the Spanish King's Basketball Cup. It is managed by the ACB and is held in Vitoria-Gasteiz, in the Fernando Buesa Arena on February 16–19, 2017. Real Madrid defended successfully the title and conquered its fourth consecutive cup, 27th overall.

The semifinal between Baskonia and Real Madrid beat the record attendance for a Copa del Rey match with 15,465 spectators. Also, the tournament beat the accumulated attendance record for a Copa del Rey edition with 103,968 accumulated spectators after seven games (14,853 spectators per game).

Qualified teams
The seven first qualified after the first half of the 2016–17 ACB regular season qualified to the tournament. As Baskonia, host team, finished between the seven first teams, the eighth qualified joined the Copa del Rey.

Draw
The 2017 Copa del Rey de Baloncesto was drawn on 16 January 2017 at approximately 12:00 CET and was broadcast live on YouTube and on TV in many countries. The seeded teams were paired in the quarterfinals with the non-seeded teams. There were not any restrictions for the draw of the semifinals. As in recent seasons, the first qualified team plays its quarterfinal game on Thursday.

Bracket

Quarterfinals

Baskonia vs. Iberostar Tenerife

Real Madrid vs. MoraBanc Andorra

Valencia Basket vs. Herbalife Gran Canaria

FC Barcelona Lassa vs. Unicaja

Semifinals

Baskonia vs. Real Madrid

FC Barcelona Lassa vs. Valencia Basket

Final

References

External links
Copa del Rey official website 
Copa del Rey news 

Copa del Rey de Baloncesto
2016–17 in Spanish basketball cups